Tahaneh or Tahneh may refer to:
Tahneh
Tahaneh-ye Olya
Tahaneh-ye Sofla
Tahaneh-ye Vosta